HMS Galgo was a Jamaican privateer that the Spanish Navy captured in 1797 and named Galgo Inglés (English greyhound), and that the British captured in November 1799. In her brief career she detained, took, or destroyed a number of small prizes before October 1800, when she foundered, with the loss of most of her crew and passengers.

Origin
On 5 May 1797 the  captured a Jamaican privateer. The Spanish renamed their prize Galgo Inglés, suggesting that the privateer's name may have been Greyhound.

Capture
In autumn 1799, a convoy of merchant vessels from England and Cork sailed to Jamaica under escort by the frigate  and the sloop . The convoy was negotiating the Mona Passage and was 10 or 12 leagues south-west of Puerto Rico on the morning of 15 November when it encountered a small Spanish squadron that was sailing from Santo Domingo to Havana. (The squadron had been escorting a Spanish convoy out past the Bahama channel, and had been escorting a schooner delivering a large amount of money to Puerto Rico and Santo Domingo.

The Spanish vessels consisted of the 64-gun ship Asia, Commodore Don Francesco Montes, 40-gun frigate Anfitrite (or Amfitrite), Captain Don Diego Villogomez, and 16-gun ship-corvette Galgo Inglés, Captain Don Josef de Arias. Captain W.G. Lobb of Crescent attempted to draw the Spanish vessels away from the convoy, and when that failed, he had the convoy disperse.

The two larger Spanish ships made for that part of the convoy under escort by Calypso, but only captured the storeship , the most valuable ship in the convoy. General Goddard might well have evaded capture had General Goddards master paid attention and followed the signals from the escorts. The Spaniards reached Havana on 16 December, having captured a schooner as well on the way. The value of their prizes, including the naval stores, which they found of great use, was 440,000 pesos.

Galgo, which had separated from the other two Spanish vessels the day before, sailed for the part of the convoy under escort by Crescent, which captured Galgo Inglés. The rest of the convoy arrived safely at Port Royal, Jamaica, some on 21 November with Calypso, and the remainder on 23 November with Crescent.

Lieutenant William Dillon sailed Galgo Inglés to Jamaica, and then assumed the position of first lieutenant on Crescent. The British took Galgo Inglés into service as HMS Galgo. (The Admiralty intended to change her name to Chance, but she foundered before this took effect.

British service
The Royal Navy commissioned Galgo under Commander George S. Stovin. In her brief career Galgo did take some prizes. Before May 1800 she captured a number of vessels: the Danish sloop Ark, of two guns, sailing from St Thomas to Jamaica in ballast; a Spanish schooner with a cargo of mahogany; the Spanish schooner Santa Catalina, carrying dry goods; the Spanish schooner Del Carmen, sailing from Puerto Rico to Jamaica; the Spanish vessel Bona Ventura; the Spanish vessel Dolorosa; and the Spanish vessel Nostra Senora del Carmen.

Then between May and September she detained or took more vessels: Spanish schooner Del Carmen, sailing from Kingston to Santiago de Cuba with dry goods; a French boat sailing from Jeremiah to Santiago de Cuba with coffee; the French schooner Resource, carrying dry goods; the American schooner Ark, in ballast, but with 1,300 dollars; a French schooner laden with coffee (destroyed); and a Spanish schooner from the Main, carrying horses.

When Lord Hugh Seymour transferred from the Leeward Islands to Jamaica, he sent Galgo to relieve Surinam, that she and her captain, Lieutenant Christopher Cole, might join him. However, the loss of Galgo frustrated this plan.

Loss
Before she foundered, one naval officer who had dined aboard her, described her as ...how very sharp and crank the brig appeared, and that being (to use a trite phrase) "all legs and wings like a butterfly", I should not like to belong to her, from a conviction, that if she ever was caught in one of the "white squalls" so peculiar to the climate, she would, in all probability, be converted into a wholesale coffin for all hands.

Galgo sailed from Jamaica on 9 September. On 9 October she was sailing off Virginia when just before midnight, as the wind picked up, the master, Thomas Forest, came on deck. He recommended a reduction in her sail area. Captain Stovin agreed, but while the crew was taking in some of the sails, a squall hit that pushed Galgo on her side. She quickly filled with water and sank within five minutes. Ninety-six crew members, including Captain Stovin, and some 19 passengers drowned, including three women; 25 men survived by hanging on to wreckage. A report from a survivor stated that when she fell over, Stovins exclaimed "Good God! she's over! I can't swim."

Next morning, Hunter, an American ship under the command of Captain John McClintock and sailing from the West Indies to Bristol, happened to come by and rescued the survivors. Hunter took the survivors to New England, where several deserted the Royal Navy.

The Admiralty had intended to change Galgos name to Chance, but she was lost before the change could take effect.

As a consequence of the loss of Galgo, the Admiralty sent out an order barring the purchase of any more vessels captured from the enemy. Still, the Admiralty must have relented as they did purchase Vengeance, and subsequently other vessels.

Notes, citations, and references
Notes

Citations

References
Cabinet album (1830) The cabinet album, a collection of original and selected literature. (Hurst, Chance and Co.).
 

 
 
 
 

1796 ships
Ships built in Spain
Corvettes of the Spanish Navy
Brig-sloops of the Royal Navy
Captured ships
Maritime incidents in 1800
Shipwrecks in the Atlantic Ocean
Shipwrecks of the Virginia coast